Matti Lattu (born June 21, 1971) is a Finnish judoka. He placed 7th at the 1997 European Judo Championships with three wins and two losses. As of 2018, he holds a 5th degree black belt.

Achievements

Lattu was the CEO of a software business: http://www.heeros.com until 2019.

References

External links

1971 births
Living people
Finnish male judoka
Place of birth missing (living people)
20th-century Finnish people